Alexis Preller (6 September 1911 – 13 December 1975) was a South African painter. He trained at the Westminster School of Art from which he graduated in 1934 and later at the Académie de la Grande Chaumière in Paris (1937).

He was especially influenced by Vincent van Gogh and Paul Gauguin and visited European galleries and museums to study these artists' works. Elements of Gauguin can be seen in his paintings on South African subjects such as the Garden of Eden (1937). Over time, he developed his own style and his works showed an array of elements from nature, African masks and other African art.  One finds this overlay of his personal style on African themes most illuminatingly expressed in works such as Basuto Allegory (1947).  Travels in Europe and North Africa gave further expression to his output which became influenced by the frescoes of Piero della Francesca and Egyptian murals.  One sees this influence in works such as Hieratic Women (1956).

Preller's later unique style isolated him from the artistic movements of the 20th century, nor did he fit into any conventional style of the old school.  Although highly regarded in his native Pretoria, this was not initially the case elsewhere in South Africa – an exhibition of his works in Cape Town in the late 1960s was coolly received by art critics there.

Recognition for his work has grown since then, and the opening of the most recent major exhibition, Africa, the Sun and the Shadows of his works at Johannesburg's Standard Bank Gallery on 13 October 2009 was strongly attended.

References

External links
 Alexis Preller at ARTPRICE
 Revisions

1911 births
1975 deaths
Alumni of the Académie de la Grande Chaumière
20th-century South African painters
20th-century male artists
South African male painters